The Lambda Literary Award for LGBT Studies is an annual literary award, presented by the Lambda Literary Foundation, presented to scholarly work that address "issues relating to sexual orientation and gender identity, and oriented toward academia, libraries, cultural professionals, and the more academic reader." Most works are published by university presses.

Recipients

References 

LGBT Studies
English-language literary awards
Lists of LGBT-related award winners and nominees